Willo the Wisp is a British cartoon series originally produced in 1981 by the BBC and narrated by Kenneth Williams. It became popular with children and adults, as it bridged the gap between the end of weekday children's programming and the early evening news. A second series was produced in 2005.

First series (1981)
The series was written and directed by Nick Spargo and produced by Nicholas Cartoon Films, in association with the BBC and Tellytales Enterprises. The character of Willo the Wisp originated in an educational animation created by Spargo for British Gas plc in 1975 and the stories were set in Doyley Woods, a small beech wood in Oxfordshire, near the director's home.

Kenneth Williams provided voices for all of the characters. The principal narrator, Willo the Wisp, was a blue, floating creature drawn as a caricature of Williams, while the name refers to the ghostly light will-o'-the-wisp from folklore. The other main characters were Arthur the caterpillar, as a gruff cockney; Mavis Cruet, a plump, clumsy fairy with an erratic, magic wand; and the principal antagonist, Evil Edna, a witch in the form of a walking, talking television set, who could zap people with her aerials.

Other characters included Carwash, a snooty bespectacled cat who was based on Noël Coward with the catchphrase "My eyes are not first-class, you know"; The Moog, a supposed dog who is not allowed to think for himself; Twit, a small bird; The Beast, a former prince turned into a hairy shambling creature by Evil Edna; the Astrognats, a group of bugs who explore outer space by means of their toadstool rocket; the Bookworm; gnomes and a regiment of toy soldiers.

Each of the original 26 episodes lasted approximately 5 minutes and were broadcast at 5:35pm on BBC1. This continued a tradition of short cartoons, such as The Magic Roundabout and The Wombles, being shown on weekdays between the end of the main children's programming for that afternoon and the BBC Early Evening news at 5:40pm. The series was repeated on satellite channel Galaxy in 1989 and on Channel 4 during the early 1990s.

Episodes

 "The Bride-Groom"
 "Edna's Secret"
 "Food For Thought"
 "Holidays"
 "The Dragon"
 "The Wishbone": The Moog encounters a magic wishbone by chance and uses it to wish for the power of thinking so he can make all kinds of wishes.  When the Moog wishes that Evil Edna was nice, Edna decides to take the wishbone from the Moog, only for the Moog to make one more wish.
 "The Chrysalis": Inspired by the moths that appear in the Doyley Wood at night, Arthur builds a chrysalis and purchases a moth suit in order to become a moth himself.  When his first time flying encounters a technical hitch, Evil Edna decides to "help" him with an evil spell.
 "The Magnet"
 "Wugged Wocks"
 "The Flight of Mavis"
 "The Thoughts of Moog": When the Moog starts thinking for the very first time, he thinks about throwing a tomato in Evil Edna's face.  Rather than turn him into a frog for such a thought, Edna decides to use the Moog's inexperience with thinking to her advantage.
 "The Joys of Spring"
 "Games With Edna": When Evil Edna turns Mavis into a weeping willow tree, Arthur orders Edna to remove the spell and vows to use "Caterpillar Magic" on Edna as payback if she does not comply.  The "magic" comes soon enough when Arthur purchases a video game controller from a traveling salesman, hooks it up to Edna, and uses her to play tennis.
 "The Hot Hot Day"
 "Halloween": Halloween in the Doyley Woods just also happens to be Evil Edna's birthday.  In order to prevent her from turning them all into frogs for the occasion, Mavis conjures up a witch kit so Edna can join the other witches up in the sky.  The catch with Edna's present is that everyone (including Arthur) must think positive thoughts to keep Mavis' spell working, but when Edna, in gratitude for her birthday present, casts a "Stay as you are forever" spell on everyone (while they still have their Halloween masks on), it does not last long.
 "The Gnome"
 "Boring Old Edna"
 The "You Know What"
 "The Bean-Stalk"
 "Cats and Dogs": Evil Edna makes it "rain cats and dogs" quite literally, when she floods the forest with replicas of Carwash and the Moog.
 "The Midas Touch"
 "The Viqueen"
 "The Potion"
 "The Beauty Contest"
 "Magic Golf" 
 "Christmas Box"

On the Kult Kidz Gold DVD, there was an extra video "Do Not Touch" which featured the last part of "Cats and Dogs", where Evil Edna makes the screen blank.

In January 2008, a promotional DVD containing all 26 episodes from Season 1 was distributed by The Times newspaper.

Credits
The Voices of: Kenneth Williams
Music by: Tony Kinsey
Script and Direction: Nicholas Spargo
Animation: Ron Murdoch, Ted Percival, Mike Pocock
Devised and Designed by: Nick Spargo
Editor: Michael Crane
Backgrounds: Mary Spargo
Camera: Chris King
Production Assistant: Andrea Fontaine
Trace & Paint: Lynne Sachs & Ian Sachs
Produced by: Nicholas Cartoon Films Ltd
Processed by: Rank Film Laboratories Ltd

Second series (2005)

A second series of 26 episodes (5 minutes each) was produced by Bobbie Spargo in 2005, and voiced by James Dreyfus. Although it maintains the style of the original, alterations include:
Willo no longer being a caricature of Williams, but rather one of Dreyfus.
Mavis being slimmer (although still too heavy to fly).
Evil Edna being a widescreen television, with a wheeled stand instead of the original's metal legs, and many more channels, and had more powers, one example is using her electricity to grab somebody, similar to Emperor Palpatine from Star Wars.

The second series aired on Playhouse Disney UK.

Episodes

 "Moon on a Stick"
 "The Toothache"
 "The Nature Walk"
 "Feed the Birds"
 "The Magic Bone"
 "The Knotted Handkerchief"
 "The Little Cloud"
 "The Mind Reader"
 "The Fancy Dress Ball"
 "Bowling for Carwash"
 "The Knee-Knocking Tree"
 "The Best Friend"
 "The Tiddle Me Wink"
 "The Makeover"
 "The Miracle"
 "The Love Bug"
 "The Wobbly Wood"
 "The Doyley Hunt"
 "The Cocoa Demon"
 "The Beauty Spot"
 "The Curse of Celebrity"
 "The Lost City of Polenta"
 "The Woodwind"
 "The Vegetable Garden"
 "The Art Class"
 "Here Comes the Judge"

References

External links

1980s British animated television series
1980s British children's television series
1981 British television series debuts
1981 British television series endings
2000s British animated television series
2000s British children's television series
2005 British television series debuts
2005 British television series endings
British children's animated fantasy television series
BBC children's television shows
Television about fairies and sprites
Television series about ghosts
Television about magic
Witchcraft in television
Television series by Little Brother Productions